Quinchía, also known as Villa de los Cerros (Village of the Hills), is a town and municipality in the Department of Risaralda, Colombia.
In 1985 Quinchía was described as the prettiest village of Risaralda, for governor of that department. 
Sebastian Belalcázar was the first European to arrive in this territory. Located in the Colombian coffee growing axis, it was made part of the "Coffee Cultural Landscape" UNESCO World Heritage Site in 2011.

References

External links
 Official Website Official website of Quinchía's Town Hall.
 Hospital Nazareth Hospital Nazareth, located at the urban area of Quinchía, provides health services to local community.
 QTV Blog of the local radio station a TV channel. Radio Quinchía Televisión.
Quinchía.com  Website about Quinchía, Risaralda.

Municipalities of Risaralda Department